The monument to Enrico Martínez is installed next to the Mexico City Metropolitan Cathedral and Zócalo, in the historic center of Mexico City, Mexico.

References

External links

 

Historic center of Mexico City
Monuments and memorials in Mexico City
Outdoor sculptures in Mexico City
Statues in Mexico City